Marek Kamiński (born 24 March 1964 in Gdańsk) is a Polish political scientist and explorer. He is currently a professor political science at UC Irvine. He is the author of the book, Games Prisoners Play: The Tragicomic Worlds of Polish Prison, about his own experiences as a political prisoner. The book won the 2004 Distinguished Book Award from the European Academy of Sociology.

He is claimed to have reached both the North and the South Pole in one year without outside assistance (the North Pole on 23 May 1995; the South Pole on 27 December 1995).

Biography 
Kaminski obtained his philosophy and physics degrees at the University of Warsaw and completed the advanced management graduate program at the IESE Business School in Barcelona. He also studied philosophy in Hamburg.

 
He led the first-ever expedition to the North Pole and the South Pole with a person with a disability (Jan Mela, who was 15 at the time).

During his "Third Pole" expedition along St. James’ trail, he travelled  in 140 days from the tomb of Immanuel Kant in Kaliningrad, Russia, to the grave of Saint James in Santiago de Compostela, Spain.

He has travelled  by electric car from Poland to Japan through Siberia and the Gobi Desert. He was the first person to drive on the Trans-Siberian Highway in an emission-free vehicle. Kamiński is the founder of the ‘Power 4Change’ motivational method and the founder of the Marek Kamiński Foundation. The Marek Kamiński Institute and Invena.

Lectures 
Kamiński has applied his experience in motivation to achieve seemingly impossible goals, as well as work-related to robots and artificial intelligence to give lectures at prestigious universities and conferences around the world.

Publications 
Kamiński has authored 13 books covering his global treks and inward journeys. Some of these books have been translated in as much as 10 languages, winning numerous awards and becoming bestsellers.

The Power4Change method 
An original motivational. It consists of 10 components, such as visualization, the path being more important than the end goal and getting to know oneself.

The method was created based on Kamiński's experience in achieving difficult goals. The Power4Change method is delivered through workshops, training sessions and conferences for companies and individuals and through the "Power4Change" application, available in Poland and worldwide.

Personal life 
He was brought up in Połczyn-Zdrój (Pomerania). In 1982 he graduated from Władysław Broniewski high school in Koszalin. He studied philosophy and physics at Warsaw University and an Advanced Management Program at IESE Business School. He is the founder and co-owner of a company called Invena S.A. and founder of the Marek Kamiński Foundation.

He lives in Gdynia with his wife, daughter, and son.

See also 
 List of Poles

References

External links 
The official website of Marek Kamiński
Instytut Marka Kamińskiego

1964 births
Living people
People from Gdańsk
Polish explorers
Explorers of Antarctica
Explorers of the Arctic
Polish businesspeople